Dennis Rasmussen (born 3 July 1990) is a Swedish professional ice hockey centre who is currently playing for HC Davos of the National League (NL).

Playing career
Rasmussen played as a youth and made his professional debut with VIK Västerås HK before he was brought to Växjö Lakers after their promotion to the Elitserien on 14 April 2011. After two successful seasons establishing a position within the team, Rasmussen was re-signed to a two-year extension on 30 January 2013.

Following a successful 2013–14 season with the Lakers, in which he finished 10th in league scoring with 40 points, Rasmussen agreed to a one-year entry level contract with the Chicago Blackhawks of the NHL on 10 June 2014. He scored his first career NHL goal in his first NHL game on 8 December 2015 against Pekka Rinne of the Nashville Predators.

On 7 July 2017, he signed a one-year, one-way contract worth $725,000 with the Anaheim Ducks. He began the 2017–18 season on the Ducks fourth line. In a depth role, Rasmussen collected 4 points in 27 games before on he was placed and cleared waivers and was re-assigned to the Ducks' AHL affiliate, the San Diego Gulls on 29 December 2017. On 13 February 2018, Rasmussen signed with his former team, the Växjö Lakers of the Swedish Hockey League (SHL), after his contract was terminated by the Ducks.

On 3 June 2021, Rasmussen was signed as a free agent to a two-year contract with Swiss club, HC Davos of the NL.

Career statistics

Regular season and playoffs

International

Awards and honours

References

External links

1990 births
Living people
Anaheim Ducks players
Chicago Blackhawks players
HC Davos players
Metallurg Magnitogorsk players
Rockford IceHogs (AHL) players
San Diego Gulls (AHL) players
Swedish expatriate ice hockey players in the United States
Swedish expatriate sportspeople in Switzerland
Swedish ice hockey centres
Undrafted National Hockey League players
Växjö Lakers players
VIK Västerås HK players
Sportspeople from Västerås
Swedish expatriate sportspeople in Russia
Expatriate ice hockey players in Russia
Expatriate ice hockey players in Switzerland